Boreing may refer to:

People
Jeremy Boreing, an American director
Vincent Boreing, a U.S. Representative from Kentucky

Other
Boreing, Kentucky, a community in the United States

See also
Boring (disambiguation)